George Arthur Maurice Hamilton-Gordon, 2nd Baron Stanmore  (3 January 1871 – 13 April 1957), was a British Liberal politician.

Biography
Stanmore was the only son of Arthur Hamilton-Gordon, 1st Baron Stanmore, youngest son of Prime Minister George Hamilton-Gordon, 4th Earl of Aberdeen. His mother was Rachel Emily, daughter of Sir John George Shaw-Lefevre. He was educated at Winchester and Trinity College, Cambridge.

He served from 1892 to 1895 as private secretary to successively the First Commissioner of Works and the President of the Local Government Board (both offices were held by his uncle George Shaw-Lefevre).

Hamilton-Gordon was enlisted with the Hampshire Regiment, but in January 1902 transferred to be captain of the 3rd Battalion, the Gordon Highlanders.

After succeeding his father in the barony in 1912 Stanmore served as a Lord-in-waiting (government whip in the House of Lords) under H. H. Asquith and then David Lloyd George from 1914 to 1922. He never returned to the government but was Chief Liberal Whip in the House of Lords from 1923 to 1944 and served as a Deputy Speaker of the House of Lords. From 1921 to 1937 he was also Treasurer of St Bartholomew's Hospital. He was made a CVO in 1922 and a KCVO in 1930 and was sworn of the Privy Council in 1932.

The Lord Stanmore died in April 1957, aged 86. He never married and the title became extinct on his death. He gets a mention in historian Michael Bloch's book Closet Queens as a "homosexual bachelor."

References

External links
 
 www.thepeerage.com

1871 births
1957 deaths
Barons in the Peerage of the United Kingdom
Knights Commander of the Royal Victorian Order
Knights of Justice of the Order of St John
Liberal Party (UK) Lords-in-Waiting
Members of the Privy Council of the United Kingdom
Alumni of Trinity College, Cambridge
People educated at Winchester College
Gay politicians
LGBT peers
English LGBT politicians